Desert Christian Schools is a private Christian school system in Tucson, Arizona. Offering grades PK-12, it operates Preschool, elementary, middle and high schools.

History
The high school was founded in 1986 in rented space at Christ Community Church, with 23 9th- and 10th-grade students and seven faculty members. It moved to the El Camino Baptist Church campus on East Speedway Boulevard in 1991 as its enrollment approached 100. It was expanded with a middle school in 2000 and elementary school in 2004. The high school and middle school moved from the El Camino campus to a location nearby, also on Speedway Boulevard, in 2001. In 2011, the elementary and middle schools moved to a purpose-built location on Wrightstown Road.

References

Christian schools in Arizona
Private high schools in Arizona
Private elementary schools in Arizona
Private middle schools in Arizona